Joseph Prag (1859, Liverpool – 23 June 1929, London) was an English Jewish communal leader. He was educated at the Liverpool Institute and Queen's College. A leader in Zionist circles, Prag founded the English section of Hovevei Zion and frequently contributed articles on the emigration of Jews to Palestine. He was a member of the Anglo-Jewish Association, acted as its delegate to the International Conference on the Jews of Rumania in 1901, and served as treasurer of the Board of Jewish Deputies (as well as a member of its Committee on Palestine). Prag took an active part in arranging matters after the Limerick pogroms of 1904.

References

1859 births
1929 deaths
British Zionists
English Jews
Jewish activists
People educated at Liverpool Institute High School for Boys
Hovevei Zion